The West Twin River may refer to any of the following rivers in the United States:

 West Twin River (Washington)
 West Twin River (Wisconsin)